The Pokororo River is a river of the Tasman Region of New Zealand's South Island. It flows southeast from the Wharepapa / Arthur Range to reach the Motueka River 15 kilometres southwest of the town of Motueka.

See also
List of rivers of New Zealand

References

Rivers of the Tasman District
Rivers of New Zealand